Lindesbergs VBK is a volleyball club in Lindesberg, Sweden, established in 1971. The club won the Swedish women's national championship in 2012

References

External links
Official website 

1971 establishments in Sweden
Sport in Västmanland County
Volleyball clubs established in 1971
Swedish volleyball clubs